The 1918–19 season was Port Vale's third season of football after going into abeyance during World War I. They finished 12th in the Football League Lancashire Section, going on to finish bottom of their group in the Subsidiary Tournament. The club applied to join the Football League in March, but were unsuccessful.

Overview
With Tom Holford largely unavailable, Jock Cameron was promoted to captain and team manager. The squad had to be made up largely of players available and willing to play, with only the Pearson brothers (Harry and Albert) offering much in the way of continuity from the previous campaign. The team started with a four-game unbeaten run, only to pick up one point from their next six games. The poor run included an embarrassing 8–1 defeat by Stoke at the Old Recreation Ground. The war was drawing to a close, ending on 11 November, but not before claiming the lives of Bob Suart and Jack Shelton. Vale beat bottom-club Burnley 4–2 five days later, and began to be strengthened by first-team players who returned from their wartime duties – as were every other club however. From this point Vale began winning their home games but losing their away matches, ending this run with a 2–0 win over Preston North End at Deepdale on 18 January – the first away win of the campaign. A sign of things returning to normal was the sale of Albert Pearson to Liverpool in January.

As players again started to be paid their regular wage, the Football League began a tax on rich clubs to support poorer clubs, which benefited Vale to the tune of £71. Eager to win a place in the expanding Football League the following season, Vale appointed former England international Joe Schofield as team secretary in January. Four straight wins around new year was followed by four straight defeats in February, though attendances began to rise again back to regular peacetime levels. On 10 March the Football League held a vote on which clubs to admit for the 1919–20 season and Vale were disappointed to only tally 27 votes, leaving Stoke, West Ham United, South Shields, Rotherham County and Coventry City as the successful applicants. Vale also ended the league programme with eight defeats in their last ten matches, losing heavily to Oldham Athletic, Manchester City and Blackburn Rovers. They ended the season 12th out of 16 teams, scoring 39 goals whilst conceding 77. The club set up a Supporters' club in April with 220 members each contributing a shilling subscription. Vale again fared poorly in the six game Subsidiary Tournament, losing four and winning only once. They did end in positive fashion though, beating Potteries derby rivals Stoke 4–1 in front of a season-high crowd of 16,000.

Results
Port Vale's score comes first

Legend

Football League Lancashire Section

League table

Matches

Lancashire Section Subsidiary Tournament

League table

Matches

Player statistics

Appearances

Top scorers

Transfers

Transfers in

Transfers out

References
Specific

General

Port Vale F.C. seasons
Port Vale